The Tunisia national under-23 minifootball team, nicknamed Les Aigles de Carthage (The Eagles of Carthage or The Carthage Eagles), belongs to the Tunisian Minifootball Federation. Since 2018 the team has played one time in the U23 WMF World Cup.

Competition records
 Champions   Runners-up   Third place   Fourth place

Red border color indicates tournament was held on home soil.

U23 WMF World Cup

See also 
Tunisia national minifootball team
Tunisia women's national minifootball team
Tunisian Minifootball Federation

References

National sports teams of Tunisia
MiniFootball in Tunisia
African national association minifootball teams